The 2015 Nigerian Senate election in Plateau State was held on March 28, 2015, to elect members of the Nigerian Senate to represent Plateau State. Jeremiah Useni representing Plateau South, Joshua Dariye representing Plateau Central and Jonah David Jang representing Plateau North all won on the platform of Peoples Democratic Party.

Overview

Summary

Results

Plateau South 
Peoples Democratic Party candidate Jeremiah Useni won the election, defeating All Progressives Congress candidate John Nanzip Shagaya and other party candidates.

Plateau Central 
Peoples Democratic Party candidate Joshua Dariye won the election, defeating All Progressives Congress candidate Satzilang Pilit and other party candidates.

Plateau North 
Peoples Democratic Party candidate Jonah David Jang won the election, defeating All Progressives Congress candidate Eunice Ayisa and other party candidates.

References 

Plateau State Senate elections
March 2015 events in Nigeria
PLa